Cheilotheca is a small genus of myco-heterotrophic plants in the family (Ericaceae). As currently circumscribed the group includes three species.

Etymology
The genus was named by Joseph Dalton Hooker in 1876. The name is derived from the Greek word "cheilos", meaning a lip or an edge.  The "theca" is a Latin term, meaning covering or sheath.  Together they essentially mean "lipped sheath".

Taxonomy
Based on morphological analyses, Cheilotheca has been placed in the Ericaceae subfamily Monotropoideae.  The exact placement of Cheilotheca within the Monotropoideae is still unknown, but morphologically the genus most closely resembles Monotropa and Monotropastrum.

List of species
Cheilotheca khasiana Hook.f.
Cheilotheca malayana Scort. ex Hook.f.
Cheilotheca sleumerana H.Keng

References

External links
Cheilotheca at The Plant List
Cheilotheca at the Encyclopedia of Life
Cheilotheca at the Flora of Taiwan Checklist

Monotropoideae
Ericaceae genera
Taxa named by Joseph Dalton Hooker